"Baby Britain" is a song by American singer-songwriter Elliott Smith. It was released in 1999 by record label DreamWorks as the second single from his fourth studio album, XO.

Release 

"Baby Britain" was released in 1999 by record label DreamWorks as the second single from his fourth studio album, XO. The single did not chart in the United States but reached number 55 in the UK Singles Chart.

Music video 

A music video, directed by Steve Hanft, was made for the song. In the video, Smith can be seen in a recording studio playing various instruments, including a guitar, piano, mandolin and drums. There is also footage of Smith playing live.

Cover versions 

The band Bayside covered "Baby Britain" on their 2006 album Acoustic. Seth Avett from the band Avett Brothers and Jessica Lea Mayfield covered “Baby Britain” in 2015 on the cover album “Seth Avett & Jessica Lea Mayfield Sing Elliott Smith”.

Track listings 
 CD single 1

 "Baby Britain"
 "Waltz #1 (Demo)"
 "The Enemy Is You"

 CD single 2

 "Baby Britain"
 "Some Song"
 "Bottle Up & Explode (Demo)"

 7" single

 "Baby Britain"
 "Waltz #1" (demo)

Personnel
Elliott Smith – vocals, piano, bass, drums, mandolin, organ
Rob Schnapf – guitars
Joanna Bolme – recording

References 

Elliott Smith songs
1999 singles
DreamWorks Records singles
1998 songs
Song recordings produced by Tom Rothrock
Songs written by Elliott Smith